The 1989 U.S. Women's Hard Court Championships was a women's tennis tournament played on outdoor hard courts in San Antonio, Texas in the United States and was part of the Category 3 tier  of the 1989 WTA Tour. The tournament ran from February 27 through March 5, 1989.

Finals

Singles

 Steffi Graf defeated  Ann Henricksson 6–1, 6–4
 It was Graf's 3rd title of the year and the 41st of her career.

Doubles

 Katrina Adams /  Pam Shriver defeated  Patty Fendick /  Jill Hetherington 3–6, 6–1, 6–4
 It was Adams' 2nd title of the year and the 6th of her career. It was Shriver's 4th title of the year and the 120th of her career.

External links
 Tournament draws

U.S. Women's Hard Court Championships
Connecticut Open (tennis)
U.S. Women's Hard Court Championships
U.S. Women's Hard Court Championships
U.S. Women's Hard Court Championships
U.S. Women's Hard Court Championships